Aeroflot Flight 141 was an international flight from Moscow to Prague. On 19 February 1973, the Tupolev Tu-154 crashed  short of runway 25 (now runway 24) of Prague Ruzyně Airport (now Václav Havel Airport Prague). Most of the passengers survived the crash, but many died in the fire that followed. Out of the 87 passengers and 13 crew members, 62 passengers and 4 crew members perished with 18 occupants having serious injuries and the remaining 16 with either minor or no injuries. The crash was the first loss of and first fatal accident involving the Tu-154. 

The cause of the incident was not officially determined. The crew did not report any defects or troubles between the ATC frequencies.  One theory stated wind shear, while another theory was that the pilots incorrectly set a horizontal stabilizer, yet another stated on unexpected atmospheric turbulence. The investigation of the accident also showed that controlling of the stabilizers was complicated. This was solved when the Tu-154 aircraft was being modernized to the Tu-154A.

Aircraft 
The aircraft involved was a Tupolev Tu-154, registered as CCCP-85023 was produced by the Kuibyshev Aviation Plant in September 1972. The airliner was then handed over to the customer - the USSR Ministry of Civil Aviation (operated under the Aeroflot brand ), to which it (according to some sources) arrived on 6 October.

It was operated in the 207th flying squadron as part of the Sheremetyevo Joint Air Squadron of the Central Directorate of International Air Communications (TSUMVS). For a short period of time, there were individual comments on the operation of the equipment and systems of the aircraft, but these comments were small and quickly eliminated, that is in general, the airliner was technically sound. On the day of the disaster, it completed 261 take-off-landing cycles and flew 459.1 hours, including 4.1 hours from the last repair.

Crew 
The plane was flown by an experienced crew, the composition of which was as follows:

 The Aircraft Commander (PIC)  is 41-year-old S. F. Chernetsov. The pilot of the 1st class, flew over 12,650 hours, 236 of them on the Tu-154 (including 48 hours at night). The day before the flight was on duty, the sleep before the flight was 7 hours 45 minutes.
 The co-pilot is 44-year-old V.P. Beresnev. The pilot of the 2nd class, flew over 14,650 hours, 247 of them on the Tu-154 (including 53 hours at night). The day before the flight was on duty, the rest before the flight was 9 hours.
 Navigator - 47-year-old V. Ye. Yurchenko. Navigator 1st class, flew over 4630 hours, 124 of them on Tu-154 (including 25 hours at night). The day before the flight was on duty, the rest before the flight was 9 hours.
 Flight Engineer - 34-year-old V. M. Shchegolev. Flight engineer 1st class, flew over 3710 hours, 957 of them on Tu-154 (including 323 hours at night). The day before the flight was on duty, the rest before the flight was 8 hours.
 Navigator (inspector) - 35-year-old LB Uspensky. Navigator 1st class, senior navigator of the aviation squadron, flew over 7,280 hours, over 310 of them on the Tu-154 (including 60 hours at night). The day before the disaster, the flight from Rome lasted 6 hours 35 minutes, which arrived in Moscow at 4:40 pm and the rest after which was 10 hours and 40 minutes.
 Flight engineer- instructor (checking) - 47-year-old I. I. Motasov. Flight engineer 1st class, flew 9,515 hours, 674 of them on Tu-154 (including 230 hours at night). The day before the disaster, he was flying from Rome with a duration of 6 hours 35 minutes, which arrived in Moscow at 16:40 and the rest after which was 8 hours.
 Flight radio operator-instructor - 44-year-old DI Zyazin. Flight radio operator 1st class, flew 9,987 hours, 602 of them on Tu-154 (including 156 hours at night). The day before the flight was on duty, the rest before the flight was 8 hours.
 Trainee radio operator - 42-year-old A. V. Zhukov. Flight radio operator of the 1st class, flew over 10,460 hours, only 2 of them on Tu-154. The day before the flight was on duty, the rest before the flight was 8 hours.
According to available data, all 8 flight crew members had the necessary qualifications and valid certificates, and in their past there were no accidents due to their fault.

Chronology

Flight to Prague 
The Tu-154 (i.e. CCCP-85023) performed Flight 141 on the Moscow-Prague route and at 06:50  (09:50 MSK ) on 19 February took off from Sheremetyevo Airport. The plane alignment fluctuated within the range of 19,3-22,0% MAR when installed for the Tu-154 ranges from 16.5 to 28.0% MAC, i.e. also was normal.

Flight over the Soviet Union took place at FL330 (about ), then in the vicinity of Poland, the crew climbed to FL350 (about ). After the overflight of Warsaw, the air traffic controller (ATC) permission was given to descend to FL310 (about ) and on the approach to Czechoslovakia - FL290 (about ).

Landing approach 
At that time there was an anti-cyclone over Czechoslovakia, accompanied by relatively good weather conditions without turbulence or icing. However, occasionally there were light snowfalls.

Art. Prague-tower).

Catastrophe 
Being  from the airport, the crew switched to the communication with Prague-Tower and announced the approach to the airport with the intention of landing and visual observation of the runway. At 09:06 the crew requested and received information about the braking coefficient, which was "5", as well as a re-landing clearance. At 09:06:30 the crew confirmed receipt of the information, which was the last known message from Flight 141. The airliner was following exactly on the glide path, when in the area of the near-drive radio beacon Liboc (L), when they suddenly lowered their nose at an angle of 4.62°, to which the aircraft began descending rapidly. 

Not knowing the cause of the situation, the pilots increased engine power and began to pull the controls towards themselves. Thus, trying to raise the nose and take the plane out of the descent, but these measures did not have a significant effect. At a distance of  the airliner scattered parts across the runway and immediately then, the jet fuel leaking from the ruptured fuel tanks ignited, causing a fire, which immediately began to flare up.

Rescue work 
The disaster occurred at 09:07 (10:07 local time), and just after, the fire service announced an alarm. Subsequently, the landing dispatcher also gave an alarm. However, Firefighters concentrated their efforts to rescue people in the front of the cabin, since there could still be survivors in it. Within three to four minutes, 34 people managed to escape, when by 09:14 a fire spreading on the left side engulfed the entire cabin, while the compressed air cylinders in the front part began to explode, so it was no longer possible to carry out rescue operations. At 09:17 the city fire brigades were called to help extinguish the fire, and at 09:20 the fire was subdued, although the fire in the cabin continued to be fueled by the jet fuel flowing from the destroyed tanks. At 09:45 the fire was completely brought under control.

As a result of the disaster, 62 passengers and 4 flight attendants were killed, that is, only 66 people, with 53 dead were found inside the plane, and 13 outside. According to the pathological examination, 51 people died from burns, and 15 from multiple injuries. The survivors of which 15 passengers and 3 crew members were injured. The remaining 16 occupants were relatively unharmed.

The crash of Flight 141 was the first accident in the history of the Tu-154. Also at the time of the events, in terms of the number of people who perished (66 dead), this disaster ranked second in Czechoslovakia (succeeded by the crash of TABSO Flight 101, 82 dead).

Passengers

Investigation

Conclusions of the Czechoslovakian Commission 
After analyzing the situation, the Czechoslovakian investigators made the following conclusions:

 The pre-flight training of the aircraft and the crew carried out in accordance with the established rules. The aircraft was technically sound, the flight took place along the set route and at set altitudes up to the Libots (L) locator beacon. Throughout the flight, the crew did not report any problems or difficulties.
 All crew members had the necessary licenses and qualifications, and their health was assessed as good.
 The aircraft had a valid airworthiness certificate and was serviced in accordance with the current instructions and manuals. Throughout the entire period of operation, its design did not change, and all detected faults were promptly eliminated.
 During takeoff and landing, the weight and balance of the airliner did not go beyond the established limits.
 The fuel used was in accordance with the requirements.
 No dangerous weather events were predicted or reported to the crew during the flight and during the landing approach. Before landing, the flight took place in visual weather conditions.
 The radio navigation equipment on the flight route and at the airport worked normally.
 Radio communication between the aircraft and traffic control was normal.
 There were no malfunctions of the airport radio equipment during Flight 141's approach as the crew did neither reported any troubles or defects, nor did they squawk 7600. 
 Flight recorders were working and immediately after the disaster, they were sent for examination.
 There was no violation of the structural integrity of the aircraft prior to its collision with the ground.
 The fire appeared immediately, as soon as the right wing panel hit the ground, after which it began to spread rapidly. When the plane capsized, fuel began to spill into the fuselage, fueling flames inside and outside the fuselage. Rescue and firefighting operations began within two minutes of the disaster.
 The airliner completely collapsed in the crash.
 The approach lights of Runway 25 were also damaged.
 The accident killed 66 people, 18 people were seriously injured and 16 were relatively unharmed. With the exception of the four perished flight attendants, a significant portion of the crew survived the crash.
 During rescue operations, 34 people managed to get out of the burning plane. According to the testimony of the surviving passengers, the design and construction of the seat belt buckles significantly complicated the rescue and evacuation work.

In connection with the complete destruction of the plane in a collision with the ground and the subsequent fire, a commission from the Ministry of Transport of Czechoslovakia came to the conclusion that it could not accurately determine the cause of the disaster. There is only a possibility that during the landing approach the Tu-154 encountered an unexpected turbulence and got under the influence of wind shear.

Conclusions of the Soviet Commission 

Soviet investigators criticized the work of the 207th flying squadron, whose leadership carried out the organization to prepare for the flight with serious violations, including:         

 The commander of the flight squadron P. N. Karteriev and the acting commander of the aviation squadron K. F. Chanov were replaced before the flight with the navigator and flight engineer, although there was no reason for this, thereby violating the order of the Ministry of Civil Aviation No. 275-70.
 The flight assignment included two inspectors and one trainee, which violated paragraph 4.1.12 of the GA-71 flight operations manual (NPP). As a result, a situation arose: when there were several inspectors in the cockpit at once, this complicated the interaction within the crew, and also led to the fact that the work of the crew was disrupted at an important stage - the execution of the landing approach.

The possible reason for the disaster to occur is when the investigators called the error of the crew commander Chernetsov, who at low altitude shifted the stabilizer from the landing position to the flight position. Having deviated from the requirements of the Flight Operations Manual and did not ensure the landing configuration of his aircraft in time, the commander, by his actions, led to a lack of time, which in turn significantly contributed to further erroneous actions to control the stabilizer and create an emergency. The very design of the stabilizer control switch allows such a mistake, and therefore, imperceptibly for the crew, the stabilizer changed its angle from -5.5° to 0°. But in the landing position, the stabilizer created a pitching moment, trying to raise the nose of the aircraft, while compensating for a significant diving moment opposite in direction, which was created by the landing configuration of the wing and vice versa, tried to lower the nose. Shifting the stabilizer to the flight position led to the fact that the pitching moment was removed, after which the diving moment began to lower the nose. Attempts by the crew to correct the situation by deflecting the steering wheel turned out to be ineffective due to the small area elevators.

Effects 
For the period of the investigation, all Tu-154s were temporarily grounded. Soon the design of the aircraft was tweaked, including emergency exits, increased engine power, and also changed the control system. Subsequently, the Kuibyshev aircraft plant began to produce the Tu-154 model A, and shortly after the model B.

See also 

 Western Airlines Flight 2605
 Nigeria Airways Flight 2120
 Aeroflot Flight 1492
 Cathay Pacific Flight 780

References

Aviation accidents and incidents in 1973
1973 in Czechoslovakia
Accidents and incidents involving the Tupolev Tu-154
141
Airliner accidents and incidents with an unknown cause
Aviation accidents and incidents in Czechoslovakia
Czechoslovakia–Soviet Union relations
1973 in the Soviet Union
February 1973 events in Europe
